De Van is a metal band founded 2009 in Stockholm, Sweden.

Their song "Play Us" is currently the theme song for the MTV reality show "PlayUs".

History
The band began in 2007 when Eric De Van met Tord Bäckström and Stefan Åberg, two well known producers.  Eric De Van was given the opportunity to do the vocals for the theme song on MTV's show "Play Us". Bäckström immediately recognized Eric De Van's potential and they decided to join together.

The band acquired new members in the following years and they played their first live gig in the spring on 2009 only after three weeks of the band being complete.

Members
Eric De Van – Vocals
Mike Laver – Lead Guitar
Greg Andersson – Lead Guitar
Cee – Bass Guitar
Bjarne Gudmundsson – Drums
Joan - Keyboards

References 

Swedish musical groups